The first international Sámi Conference was officially opened in Jokkmokk, Sweden on August 31, 1953 and closed four days later on September 3. Since then, the Sámi conferences have come to be important venues for the Sámi across Norway, Sweden, Finland and Russia to come together and discuss critical Sámi issues. Delegates have used the conferences as a forum to approve cultural symbols such as the Sami flag, the Sámi anthem Sámi soga lávlla, and Sami National Day.

List of Sámi Conferences

References

External links
Report for the 9th Sámi Conference (PDF)

Sámi
International conferences
Recurring events established in 1953
1953 establishments in Sweden